Harriet Harman led the Shadow Cabinet during her time as pro tempore Leader of the Labour Party in 2010—from the time Gordon Brown resigned as Labour Leader (and Prime Minister) until Ed Miliband was elected to the leadership.

With a few exceptions, Labour Cabinet ministers retained their roles in the Shadow Cabinet. Harman, who had been Leader of the House of Commons, gave the responsibility of shadowing that role to Rosie Winterton, who had attended Cabinet as Minister for Regional Economic Development and Coordination. The two peers who led Cabinet departments, Peter Mandelson at Business, Innovation and Skills and Andrew Adonis at Department for Transport, left the Shadow Cabinet in the first few days after Labour entered opposition. They were replaced by Pat McFadden and Sadiq Khan, respectively.

Members of the Shadow Cabinet

Harman
Official Opposition (United Kingdom)
2010 establishments in the United Kingdom
2010 disestablishments in the United Kingdom
British shadow cabinets
2010 in British politics
Harriet Harman